is a Japanese boxer. He competed in the men's bantamweight event at the 1984 Summer Olympics.

References

1960 births
Living people
Japanese male boxers
Olympic boxers of Japan
Boxers at the 1984 Summer Olympics
People from Saga Prefecture
Sportspeople from Saga Prefecture
People from Saga (city)
Boxers at the 1982 Asian Games
Asian Games competitors for Japan
Bantamweight boxers
20th-century Japanese people